Post-amendment to the Tamil Nadu Entertainments Tax Act 1939 on 4 October 2004, Gross fell to 115 per cent of Nett. Commercial Taxes Department disclosed 43.65 crore in entertainment tax revenue for the year.

A list of films produced in the Tamil film industry in India in 2005 by release date:

List of Tamil films

January—March

April—June

July—September

October—December

Other releases
The following Tamil films also released in 2005, though the release date remains unknown.

Awards

References

2005
Films, Tamil
Lists of 2005 films by country or language
2000s Tamil-language films